Michael James Danzey (born 8 February 1971) is an English former professional footballer who played as a forward in the Football League for Chester City, Peterborough United, Cambridge United and Scunthorpe United. He also played non-league football for Boston United, St Albans City, Farnborough Town, Aylesbury United and Woking.

References

1971 births
Living people
Footballers from Widnes
Association football forwards
English footballers
Nottingham Forest F.C. players
Boston United F.C. players
Chester City F.C. players
Peterborough United F.C. players
St Albans City F.C. players
Cambridge United F.C. players
Farnborough F.C. players
Scunthorpe United F.C. players
Aylesbury United F.C. players
Woking F.C. players
English Football League players
National League (English football) players
Isthmian League players